Monocaine or monocane may refer to:

 Monocaine hydrochloride (butethamine hydrochloride), a local anesthetic
 Monocane, a fictitious drug that takes the colour from whoever or whatever ingests it; it also causes aggression and insanity (The Invisible Man).
 Monocane, a fictional poison in the Matlock episodes "The Nurse", "The Heist", "The Fatal Seduction: Part 2"  and "The Hucksters".
 Monocane, a fictional poison in the Jekyll and Hyde TV show.
 Monocane, a fictional poison in the Perry Mason TV movie A Perry Mason Mystery: The Case of the Lethal Lifestyle
 Monocane, a fictional poison in the McBride TV movie The Doctor is Out ... Really Out
 Monocane, a fictional poison in the Diagnosis Murder TV series show, episode Murder Two part 1 & part 2 1997
 Monocaine is referred to in the lyrics of the third verse of the song "Transmaniacon MC" by the band Blue Öyster Cult.